The 1956 Marquette Warriors football team was an American football team that represented Marquette University as an independent during the 1956 NCAA University Division football season. In its first season under head coach John F. Druze, the team compiled a 0–9 record and was outscored by a total of 303 to 72. The team played its home games at Marquette Stadium in Milwaukee.

Schedule

References

Marquette
Marquette Golden Avalanche football seasons
College football winless seasons
Marquette Warriors football